In mathematics, a Hermitian matrix (or self-adjoint matrix) is a complex square matrix that is equal to its own conjugate transpose—that is, the element in the -th row and -th column is equal to the complex conjugate of the element in the -th row and -th column, for all indices  and :

or in matrix form:

Hermitian matrices can be understood as the complex extension of real symmetric matrices.

If the conjugate transpose of a matrix  is denoted by  then the Hermitian property can be written concisely as

Hermitian matrices are named after Charles Hermite, who demonstrated in 1855 that matrices of this form share a property with real symmetric matrices of always having real eigenvalues. Other, equivalent notations in common use are  although in quantum mechanics,  typically means the complex conjugate only, and not the conjugate transpose.

Alternative characterizations

Hermitian matrices can be characterized in a number of equivalent ways, some of which are listed below:

Equality with the adjoint

A square matrix  is Hermitian if and only if it is equal to its adjoint, that is, it satisfies

for any pair of vectors  where  denotes the inner product operation.

This is also the way that the more general concept of self-adjoint operator is defined.

Reality of quadratic forms

An  matrix  is Hermitian if and only if

Spectral properties

A square matrix  is Hermitian if and only if it is unitarily diagonalizable with real eigenvalues.'Applications

Hermitian matrices are fundamental to quantum mechanics because they describe operators with necessarily real eigenvalues. An eigenvalue  of an operator  on some quantum state  is one of the possible measurement outcomes of the operator, which necessitates the need for operators with real eigenvalues.

Examples and solutions

See the following example:

The diagonal elements must be real, as they must be their own complex conjugate.

Well-known families of Hermitian matrices include the Pauli matrices, the Gell-Mann matrices and their generalizations. In theoretical physics such Hermitian matrices are often multiplied by imaginary coefficients,Physics 125 Course Notes at California Institute of Technology which results in skew-Hermitian matrices.

Here, we offer another useful Hermitian matrix using an abstract example. If a square matrix  equals the product of a matrix with its conjugate transpose, that is,  then  is a Hermitian positive semi-definite matrix. Furthermore, if  is row full-rank, then  is positive definite.

Properties

Main diagonal values are real

The entries on the main diagonal (top left to bottom right) of any Hermitian matrix are real.

Only the main diagonal entries are necessarily real; Hermitian matrices can have arbitrary complex-valued entries in their off-diagonal elements, as long as diagonally-opposite entries are complex conjugates.

Symmetric

A matrix that has only real entries is symmetric if and only if it is Hermitian matrix. A real and symmetric matrix is simply a special case of a Hermitian matrix.

So, if a real anti-symmetric matrix is multiplied by a real multiple of the imaginary unit  then it becomes Hermitian.

Normal

Every Hermitian matrix is a normal matrix. That is to say, 

Diagonalizable

The finite-dimensional spectral theorem says that any Hermitian matrix can be diagonalized by a unitary matrix, and that the resulting diagonal matrix has only real entries. This implies that all eigenvalues of a Hermitian matrix  with dimension  are real, and that  has  linearly independent eigenvectors. Moreover, a Hermitian matrix has orthogonal eigenvectors for distinct eigenvalues.

Sum of Hermitian matrices

The sum of any two Hermitian matrices is Hermitian.

Inverse is Hermitian

The inverse of an invertible Hermitian matrix is Hermitian as well.

Associative product of Hermitian matrices

ABA Hermitian

If A and B are Hermitian, then ABA is also Hermitian.

 is real for complex 

For an arbitrary complex valued vector  the product  is real because of  This is especially important in quantum physics where Hermitian matrices are operators that measure properties of a system, e.g. total spin, which have to be real.

Complex Hermitian forms vector space over 

The Hermitian complex -by- matrices do not form a vector space over the complex numbers, since the identity matrix  is Hermitian, but  is not. However the complex Hermitian matrices do'' form a vector space over the real numbers .

together with the set of matrices of the form

and the matrices

where  denotes the imaginary unit, 

Eigendecomposition

where  are the eigenvalues on the diagonal of the diagonal matrix

Real determinant

The determinant of a Hermitian matrix is real:

(Alternatively, the determinant is the product of the matrix's eigenvalues, and as mentioned before, the eigenvalues of a Hermitian matrix are real.)

Decomposition into Hermitian and skew-Hermitian matrices

Additional facts related to Hermitian matrices include:
 The sum of a square matrix and its conjugate transpose  is Hermitian.
 The difference of a square matrix and its conjugate transpose  is skew-Hermitian (also called antihermitian). This implies that the commutator of two Hermitian matrices is skew-Hermitian.
 An arbitrary square matrix  can be written as the sum of a Hermitian matrix  and a skew-Hermitian matrix .

Rayleigh quotient

In mathematics, for a given complex Hermitian matrix  and nonzero vector , the Rayleigh quotient  is defined as:

For real matrices and vectors, the condition of being Hermitian reduces to that of being symmetric, and the conjugate transpose  to the usual transpose   for any non-zero real scalar  Also, recall that a Hermitian (or real symmetric) matrix has real eigenvalues.

Similarly,  and 

The Rayleigh quotient is used in the min-max theorem to get exact values of all eigenvalues. It is also used in eigenvalue algorithms to obtain an eigenvalue approximation from an eigenvector approximation. Specifically, this is the basis for Rayleigh quotient iteration.

The range of the Rayleigh quotient (for matrix that is not necessarily Hermitian) is called a numerical range (or spectrum in functional analysis). When the matrix is Hermitian, the numerical range is equal to the spectral norm. Still in functional analysis,  is known as the spectral radius. In the context of C*-algebras or algebraic quantum mechanics, the function that to  associates the Rayleigh quotient  for a fixed  and  varying through the algebra would be referred to as "vector state" of the algebra.

See also

 
 
 
 
 
 
  (anti-Hermitian matrix)

References

External links

 
 Visualizing Hermitian Matrix as An Ellipse with Dr. Geo, by Chao-Kuei Hung from Chaoyang University, gives a more geometric explanation.

Matrices